Hit-Girl is a creator-owned comic book sequel series to Kick-Ass: The Dave Lizewski Years, created by Mark Millar and illustrated by John Romita Jr. The series was published by Image Comics in 2018. The title, featuring a successive change of writers and artists for each four-issue story arc, follows Mindy McCready / Hit-Girl leaving the United States to carry on her fight for justice on a worldwide scale, depicting events mentioned in the epilogue of Book Four of The Dave Lizewski Years.

Synopsis

Season One 
The first series of Hit-Girl is retroactively referred to as Hit-Girl: Season One following the release of the second series, titled Hit-Girl: Season Two.

In Colombia

In Canada

In Rome

Season Two

In Hollywood 

In February 2019, the series restarted under the title, Hit-Girl: Season 2. The first issue featured the Kevin Smith storyline spoken about when the first series was first announced. The plot revolves around Hit-Girl's infamy having grown to legendary proportions thanks to a bestseller book, which is about to be adapted into a movie, prompting Hit-Girl to go to Hollywood and settle the matter her style. However, as she soon discovers, the movie is not going to be the only copy of her life's story.

In Hong Kong

In India

Kick-Ass vs. Hit-Girl
The first issue of Kick-Ass vs Hit-Girl, a five-issue crossover between Hit-Girl and the Kick-Ass incarnation of Patience Lee (written by Steve Niles, art by Marcelo Frusin) was published on November 11, 2020. The series concluded with the release of the fifth issue on April 11, 2021.

Characters

Mindy McCready / Hit-Girl

Critical reception
Hit-Girl was well-received for its complex stories that deal with difficult subjects, something which reflected by the mature art style of every arc bar Hit-Girl In Hollywood, the first arc of Season Two of the series. Hit-Girl was called "visually stunning" by Darryll Robson of MonkeysFightingRobots.

References

Comics by Mark Millar
Icon Comics titles
Kick-Ass (franchise)